Petrobius is a genus of jumping bristletails in the family Machilidae. Many of these primitive insects are restricted to rocky shorelines.

Species
Species include:
Petrobius adriaticus
Petrobius artemisiae
Petrobius brevistylis
Petrobius calcaratus
Petrobius crimeus
Petrobius maritimus
Petrobius persquamosus
Petrobius submutans
Petrobius superior

References
Guide to the Insects of Britain and Western Europe, Michael Chinery 1986 (reprinted 1991) 

Archaeognatha